2nd Forestry Engineering Division() was activated in August 1952. The division was composed of:
Division HQ: former headquarters of 156th Division;
4th Regiment: former 522nd Regiment, 174th Division, 58th Corps;
5th Regiment: organized from former Liangguang Column;
6th Regiment: personnel from the former 159th Division.

The division is a production unit, after its formation the unit moved to Hainan for rubber plantation.

Soon after its arrival in Hainan, the division was demobilized. The division's further fate is unknown.

References
中国人民解放军林业工程部队第二师简介, http://blog.sina.com.cn/s/blog_670e43e40101ed6r.html

Engineer divisions of the People's Liberation Army
Military units and formations established in 1952
Military units and formations disestablished in 1952